Al Fulk (L141) is an amphibious transport dock of the Qatari Emiri Navy.

Development 
The ship was built by the Italian firm Fincantieri as an enlarged and improved version of the  similar to the Algerian .

Al Fulk has a continuous flight deck with two deck-landing spots for helicopters at the bow and stern.
Besides its role as an amphibious transport dock, Al Fulk is also tasked with ballistic missile defense.

Construction and career 
Al Fulk was ordered in 2016, with her keel being laid in 2021. Her launch took place on 24 January 2023.

References 

2023 ships
San Giorgio-class amphibious transport docks
Ships of the Qatari Emiri Navy
Landing craft
Ships built by Fincantieri 
Ships built in Italy